Halina Birenbaum (Hebrew: הלינה בירנבאום; Warsaw, 15 September 1929) is a Holocaust survivor, writer, poet, translator and activist.

Life
Born in Warsaw, to Jakub Grynsztajn and Pola formerly Perl, née Kijewska, she was the youngest of three and the only daughter. After the occupation of Poland by Germany, the family's home was in area that was part of the Warsaw Ghetto. After its destruction in July 1943 they were briefly transferred to Majdanek, then on to Auschwitz. She survived forced evacuation of the camp, the Death March of January 1945, from Auschwitz to Wodzisław Śląski, from which she was transported to Ravensbrück and in February on to Neustadt-Glewe, from where she was liberated by the Red Army in May 1945. Her mother was murdered in Majdanek while her father was murdered in the Treblinka extermination camp.

In 1947, due to antisemitism, she emigrated to Israel, where she married Chaim Birenbaum and had two sons. Until the end of 1950 she worked on a kibbutz. She spends much of her time talking about her early experiences with Israeli, Polish and German youth.

Writing 
Life and death during the German occupation of Poland and the martyrdom of Polish Jewry in ghettos and extermination camps are the salient themes of her prose and poetic output. Her works, which are partly written in Polish and partly in Hebrew, have been translated into many languages, including, English French, German, Japanese and Spanish.

Awards
 In 1999 the Polish President, Aleksander Kwaśniewski awarded her the Order of Officer of Polonia Restituta

 In March 2001 she was named Person of Reconciliation 2001 by the Polish Council of Christians and Jews.

 In 2015 she was recognized for her services to Warsaw, Zasłużony dla Warszawy.

 In 2018 she was granted the "Freedom of the City of Warsaw", Honorowi Obywatele miasta stołecznego Warszawy.

Bibliography

Books
Hope is the last to die (Nadzieja umiera ostatnia), 1967.  Translated into English, German, French, Italian, Spanish, Japanese, and Hebrew
Return to ancestors' land (Powrót do ziemi praojców), 1991
Scream for remembrance (Wołanie o pamięć),1999
Far and near echoes. Meetings with young people(Echa dalekie i bliskie. Spotkania z młodzieżą), 2001
Life is dear to everyone (Życie każdemu drogie), 2005
My life began from the end. Collected Poems Of A Holocaust Survivor. (Moje życie zaczęło się od końca. Wiersze Zebrane Poetki Ocalałej Z Zagłady), 2010
They still ask (Wciąż pytają) 2011
I am looking for life in the dead, Interview with Halina Birenbaum (Szukam życia u umarłych, Wywiad z Haliną Birenbaum), 2013
It's not the rain, it's people (To nie deszcz, to ludzie), 2019

Poems
Even when I laugh (Nawet gdy się śmieję)
Not about flowers (Nie o Kwiatach)
Words cannot convey (Jak można w słowach)

References

External links
 Halina Birenbaum - Ada Holtzman homepage, zchor.org Includes extensive bibliography
 Platform for Jewish-Polish Dialogue
 Auschwitz 70th anniversary: Survivors warn of new crimes
 City of Warsaw honors Polish-Israeli writer Halina Birenbaum

1929 births
Living people
Writers from Warsaw
Warsaw Ghetto inmates
Auschwitz concentration camp survivors
Ravensbrück concentration camp survivors
Majdanek concentration camp survivors
Jewish concentration camp survivors
Polish emigrants to Israel
Israeli Jews
Israeli women poets
Israeli poets
Israeli memoirists
Date of birth missing (living people)
Women memoirists